The Realization of a Negro's Ambition is a 1916 American silent short film that is now lost. The film was directed by Harry A. Gant for the Los Angeles-based "Negro Firm" Lincoln Motion Picture Company; this two-reel film was the production company's first production and it boasted an "all star Negro cast".

Premise
An African-American man leaves his home to find success in the oil business. When he rescues the daughter of a wealthy oilman, he is given the opportunity to be the head of an expedition. He later becomes wealthy and returns home, where he marries his high school sweetheart.

Cast
Bessie Baker
Lottie Boles
Clarence Brooks
A. Burns 
Gertrude Christmas

See also

List of lost films

References

External links

The Realization of a Negro's Ambition at SilentEra

1916 films
Lost American films
American silent short films
American black-and-white films
1916 lost films
1910s English-language films
1910s American films